Noville may refer to:

Noville, Bastogne, a village in Bastogne, Luxembourg province, Wallonia, Belgium
Noville, Liège, a village in Fexhe-le-Haut-Clocher, Liège province, Wallonia, Belgium
Noville-les-Bois, a village in Fernelmont, Namur province, Wallonia, Belgium
Noville-sur-Mehaigne, a village in Éghezée, Namur province, Wallonia, Belgium
Noville, Switzerland, a municipality of the canton of Vaud, Switzerland

People with the surname
George Otto Noville (1890–1963), American aviation pioneer